Parviz Hadi Basmenj (born in Basmenj, East Azerbaijan, Iran), is an Iranian wrestler. He became Pahlevan of Iran in 2014/2015 competition.

Major achievements
 World Championships –  2018
 Asian Games –  2014, 2018
 Asian Championships –  2012, 2013, 2016
 World Cup –  2014, 2015, 2016
 Universiade –  2013

References
Profile

Living people
Asian Games gold medalists for Iran
Sportspeople from Tabriz
Wrestlers at the 2014 Asian Games
Wrestlers at the 2018 Asian Games
Asian Games medalists in wrestling
Pahlevans of Iran
Iranian male sport wrestlers
1987 births
Medalists at the 2014 Asian Games
Medalists at the 2018 Asian Games
Universiade medalists in wrestling
Universiade bronze medalists for Iran
World Wrestling Championships medalists
Medalists at the 2013 Summer Universiade
Asian Wrestling Championships medalists
20th-century Iranian people
21st-century Iranian people